Gorehabba or Gore Habba is a festival or ritual in India, of splashing cow dung on each other. This festival is celebrated a day after Diwali's Balipadyami in the small village of Gumatapura in Karnataka, India.

References

External links 
 Gorehabba festival celebrant piles cow dung, BBC Motion gallery
 Dung-slingers aim at peace, Deccan Herald

Diwali
Hindu festivals
Religious festivals in India